Beth Bernobich is an American science fiction and fantasy writer. She also goes by the pen name Claire O'Dell. She was born in Lansdowne, Pennsylvania in 1959.  Her first novel, Passion Play was published by Tor Books in October 2010, and won the Romantic Times 2010 Reviewer's Choice Award for Best Epic Fantasy. Her novel, A Study in Honor was published by Harper Voyager in July 2018 and won the 2019 Lambda Literary Award for Lesbian Mystery.

Selected works

River of Souls Series 
 "River of Souls", Tor.com, September 2010 
 Passion Play, October 2010, from Tor Books, winner for Best Epic Fantasy (2010 RT Reviewers' Choice Awards), long-listed for the 2010 Tiptree Awards
 Queen's Hunt, Tor Books, July 2012, Locus 2012 Recommended Reading List 
 Allegiance, Tor Books, October 2013
 Thief of War (novella), Tor.com, September 2013 
 Nocturnall (novelette), December 2015

Lóng City and The Seventy Kingdoms 
 "Pig, Crane, Fox: Three Hearts Unfolding", Magic in the Mirrorstone, from Mirrorstone Books, in 2008, re-released in e-book format, September 2011 
 Fox and Phoenix, from Viking in October 2011, and in audiobook from Random House in October 2011; nominated for the YASLA Best Fiction for Young Adults 
 The Ghost Dragon's Daughter (novelette), October 2015

Éireann Series 
 "A Flight of Numbers Fantastique Strange" Asimov's Magazine, June 2006 
 "The Golden Octopus", Postscripts, Summer 2008; reprinted in The Year's Best Science Fiction & Fantasy 2009, Rich Horton (ed.), January 2010; reprinted in XB-1, Czech translation, June 2011 
 Ars Memoriae, PS Publishing, December 2009 
 The Time Roads, Tor Books, October 2014; finalist for Best Fantasy Novel (2014 RT Reviewers' Choice Awards)

As Claire O'Dell

The Janet Watson Chronicles 
A Study in Honor, July 2018, Harper Voyager; Winner, Best Lesbian Mystery (2019 Lambda Literary Awards)
The Hound of Justice, July 2019, Harper Voyager; Finalist, Best Lesbian Mystery (2020 Lambda Literary Awards)

The Mage and Empire Series 
A Jewel Bright Sea, September 2019, Rebel Base Books
The Empire's Edge, TBD

River of Souls Series 
 Passion Play, October 2010, from Tor Books, winner for Best Epic Fantasy (2010 RT Reviewers' Choice Awards), long-listed for the 2010 Tiptree Awards. Second edition released under Claire O'Dell, February 2021 
 Queen's Hunt, Tor Books, July 2012, Locus 2012 Recommended Reading List. Second edition released under Claire O'Dell, February 2021 
 Allegiance, Tor Books, October 2013. Second edition released under Claire O'Dell, February 2021 
 Nocturnall (novelette), December 2015. Re-released under Claire O'Dell

Other books 
 The Time Roads, Tor Books, October 2014; finalist for Best Fantasy Novel (2014 RT Reviewers' Choice Awards). Re-released under Claire O'Dell 
 A Handful of Pearls & Other Stories, Lethe Press (June 2010), second edition published by the author (May 2011); finalist for Best Indie Fantasy/Paranormal (2011 RT Reviewers' Choice Awards)  Re-released under Claire O'Dell

References

External links
 

1959 births
Living people
American science fiction writers
American fantasy writers
21st-century American novelists
American women novelists
Women science fiction and fantasy writers
21st-century American women writers
Lambda Literary Award for Lesbian Fiction winners
People from Lansdowne, Pennsylvania
Writers from Pennsylvania